MY Albin Köbis was built in 1952 by Engelbrecht-Werft in Berlin-Köpenick on order by Wilhelm Pieck and served as the presidential yacht of the German Democratic Republic (GDR) until 1971 when it was replaced by MY Ostseeland. It was named in honour of Albin Köbis, a German sailor and revolutionary during World War I.

When Fidel Castro visited the GDR, MY Albin Köbis apparently struck a bridge during a cruise on the lakes of East-Berlin. After reunification the yacht briefly served with the Wasserschutzpolizei renamed Freundschaft (Friendship). In 1995 the ship was sold for 180.000 D-Mark in an auction and renamed La Belle (for the discotheque bombed by Libyans in 1986). In 2009, the ship was acquired by a private person and restored after having sunk in the meantime.

References

Sources
http://www.bz-berlin.de/archiv/staatsjacht-der-ddr-schippert-wieder-article1226195.html
http://www.tagesspiegel.de/berlin/piecks-staats-yacht-wird-hausboot/753146.html
http://www.oxly.de/?p=8833

1952 ships
Royal and presidential yachts
Ships built in Berlin
Ships built in East Germany
Ships of the Volksmarine